Amblyseius triangulus is a species of mite in the family Phytoseiidae.

References

triangulus
Articles created by Qbugbot
Animals described in 1997